Julien-Édouard-Alfred Dubuc (21 January 1871 – 27 October 1947) was a Canadians businessman and politician. Dubuc was an Independent Liberal and Liberal party member of the House of Commons of Canada. He was born in Saint-Hugues, Quebec, educated at Sherbrooke, and became a bank manager, a director of various companies and a manufacturer.

He was first elected to Parliament at the Chicoutimi riding in the 1925 general election as an Independent Liberal and re-elected on that basis in 1926 federal election. By the 1930 election, he became a member of the Liberal party and was re-elected at Chicoutimi in 1935 and 1940. Dubuc did not seek re-election in 1945 and left Parliament after completing his term in the 19th Canadian Parliament.

Dubuc promoted various projects in the Chicoutimi region including a rail link between Baie-des-Ha!-Ha! and Chicoutimi, and paper mills at Chandler and La Baie. The Dubuc Bridge (Pont Dubuc) across the Saguenay River at Chicoutimi was named in his honour.

References

External links
 
 

1871 births
1947 deaths
Businesspeople from Quebec
Independent Liberal MPs in Canada
Liberal Party of Canada MPs
Members of the House of Commons of Canada from Quebec
People from Montérégie